The Illinois School Report Card is a measurement of school performance administered by the Illinois State Board of Education. Each public school district in Illinois, including special charter districts, must submit to parents, taxpayers, the Governor, the General Assembly and the State Board of Education a school report card assessing the performance of its schools and students. The report card is an index of school performance measured against statewide and local standards and provides information to make prior year comparisons and to set future year targets through the school improvement plan.

Included Information

Academic Progress 
The Illinois School Report Card includes applicable test results for the groups which visit the school. This includes the SAT and the IAR. Other information, including the graduation rate and percentage of students on track to graduate are also included in this section.

Environment 
This section includes information on student surveys and finances.

Students 
Information on student demographics are included here. Information includes: racial diversity, low income, gifted, students with disabilities, and amount of absenteeism.

Accountability 
Information on school improvement funds and Title I.

Teachers 
Includes demographics on teachers at schools. Information on student teacher ratios, teacher education, teacher pay, and teacher absences are included.

Administrators 
Information on administrator pay and administrator to student ratios are included in this section.

School Highlights 
Information on courses offered as well as information on activities provided are listed here.

Feeder Schools 
Schools which feed this school

Retired Tests 
Information from previous tests which have been retired. Notable tests include: PARCC and the ACT.

See also
List of school districts in Illinois

References

External links
Illinois State Board of Education
Interactive Illinois Report Card
Chicago Tribune Report Card Application

School Report Card
School qualifications